Rhembobius is a genus of parasitoid wasps belonging to the family Ichneumonidae.

The species of this genus are found in Europe.

Species:
 Rhembobius bifrons (Gmelin, 1790) 
 Rhembobius bischoffi (Statz, 1936)

References

Ichneumonidae
Ichneumonidae genera